The bass singing voice has a vocal range that lies around the second E below middle C to the E above middle C (i.e., E2–E4). As with the contralto singing voice being the rarest female voice type, the bass voice is the rarest for males, and has the lowest vocal range of all voice types. However, the bass voice is determined not only by its vocal range, but also by its timbre, which tends to be darker than that of a baritone voice.

The term bass was developed in relation to classical and operatic voices, where the classification is based not merely on the singer's vocal range but also on the tessitura and timbre of the voice. For classical and operatic singers, their voice type determines the roles they will sing and is a primary method of categorization. In non-classical music, singers are primarily defined by their genre and their gender and not by their vocal range. When the terms soprano, mezzo-soprano, contralto, tenor, baritone, and bass are used as descriptors of non-classical voices, they are applied more loosely than they would be to those of classical singers and generally refer only to the singer's perceived vocal range.

The following is a list of singers in country, popular music, jazz, and musical theatre who have been described as basses.

List of names

See also
 Voice classification in non-classical music
List of baritones in non-classical music
 List of tenors in non-classical music
 List of contraltos in non-classical music
 List of mezzo-sopranos in non-classical music
 List of sopranos in non-classical music
 Voice type

Notes

References

Lists of musicians
Lists of singers